Roczen is a surname which means "yearling" in Polish. Notable people with the surname include:
 Anthony Roczen (born 1999), German footballer
 Ken Roczen (born 1994), German motocross and supercross racer

See also
 

Polish-language surnames